Immature personality disorder (IPD) was a type of personality disorder diagnosis. It is characterized by lack of emotional development, low tolerance of stress and anxiety, inability to accept personal responsibility, and reliance on age-inappropriate defense mechanisms. The disorder has been "gaining prominence" in the 21st century. A study in Denmark found that together, these 6 "Other" types constituted 2.4% of all personality disorder diagnoses.

While borderline personality disorder is the most common personality disorder among those who commit non-suicidal self-harm, the overall rate of deliberate self-harm is highest among those with immature personality disorder.

It has been noted for displaying "an absence of mental disability", and demonstrating "ineffectual responses to social, psychological and physical demands."

Diagnosis

DSM
Immature personality (321), as a "personality trait disturbance", first appeared in the first edition of the Diagnostic and Statistical Manual of Mental Disorders (DSM) separately from personality disorders ("pathological personality" at the time). The DSM defines the condition as follows:

In the DSM-II it became a type specifier for Other personality disorder (301.89), and remained unchanged in the DSM-III. The condition was removed in later editions.

ICD
The International Classification of Diseases (ICD) also listed the condition as Immature personality (321) in the ICD-6 and ICD-7. The ICD-8 introduced Other personality disorder (301.8) which became the main diagnosis adding "immature" as a type specifier. This classification was shared by the ICD-9 and ICD-10. The condition was removed in ICD-11.

Mechanics
IPD involves a weakness of the ego, which limits the ability to restrain impulses or properly model anxiety. They fail to integrate the aggressive and libidinal factors at play in other people, and thus are not able to parse their own experiences.

It can be caused by a neurobiological immaturity of brain functioning, or through a childhood trauma, or other means.

In law and custom
In the 1980s, it was noted that immature personality disorder was one of the most common illnesses invoked by the Roman Catholic Church in order to facilitate annulment of undesired marriages.

In 1978, David Augustine Walton was tried in Barbados for killing two passers by who had offered his mother and girlfriend a ride following an argument, and pleaded diminished capacity resulting from his immature personality disorder; he was nevertheless convicted of murder.

In 1989, a former employee of the Wisconsin Department of Transportation had his claim of discrimination dismissed, after alleging that his employment had been terminated due to his Immature Personality Disorder alongside a sexual fetish in which he placed chocolate bars under the posteriors of women whose driving capabilities he was testing.

A 1994 Australian case regarding unemployment benefits noted that while "mere personal distaste for certain work is not relevant, but a condition (such as immature personality disorder) may foreclose otherwise suitable prospects".

A 2017 study indicated that an individual with Immature Personality Disorder (among other people with personality disorders) was allowed to die through Belgian euthanasia laws that require a medical diagnosis of a life-long condition that could impair well-being.

References

Personality disorders